Piiroja may refer to:

Raio Piiroja (born 1979), ab Estonian football player
alternative name of Matsuri, Estonia, a village in Värska Parish, Põlva County
alternative name of Paasiku, a village in Anija Parish, Harju County, Estonia

Estonian-language surnames